This is a list of notable deadpan comedians and actors who have used deadpan as a part of their repertoire. Deadpan describes the act of deliberately displaying a lack of or no emotion, commonly as a form of comedic delivery to contrast with the ridiculousness of the subject matter. The delivery is meant to be blunt, sarcastic, laconic, or apparently unintentional.

List of deadpan comedians

Comedians and actors who have used deadpan as a part of their repertoire include:

 Eve Arden
 Fred Armisen
 Bea Arthur
 Rowan Atkinson
 Dan Aykroyd
 Richard Ayoade
 Bill Bailey
 Elliot Goblet
 Todd Barry
 Jason Bateman
 H. Jon Benjamin
 Jack Benny
 Maria Blasucci
 Jo Brand
 Steve Carell
 Jimmy Carr
 Michael Cera
 Chevy Chase
 Ronny Chieng
 John Cleese
 Stephen Colbert
 Billy Connolly
 Tim Conway
 Jane Curtin
 Andy Daly  
 Larry David
 Jack Dee
Zooey Deschanel
 Nathan Fielder
 Judah Friedlander
 Nick Frost
 Jim Gaffigan
 Zach Galifianakis
 Janeane Garofalo
 Rhod Gilbert
 Dave Gorman
 Charles Grodin
 Rich Hall
 Tony Hancock
 Jack Handey
 Oliver Hardy
 Steve Harvey
 Mitch Hedberg
 Bill Hicks
 Joel Hodgson
 Dave Hughes
 Jeffrey Jones
 Milton Jones
 Jonathan Katz
 Buster Keaton
 Craig Kilborn
 Steve Landesberg
 Stewart Lee
 Jack Levi
 Sean Lock
 Roger Lloyd-Pack
 Norm Macdonald
 Lee Mack
 Demetri Martin
 Paul Merton
 Larry Miller
 Sarah Millican
 Spike Milligan
 Dan Mintz
 Eugene Mirman
 Shazia Mirza
 Dylan Moran
 Eric Morecambe
 Diane Morgan
 Chris Morris
John Mulaney
 Bill Murray
 Kumail Nanjiani
 Michael J. Nelson
 Bob Newhart
 Leslie Nielsen
 Tig Notaro
 Virginia O'Brien
 Nick Offerman
 Pat Paulsen
 Karl Pilkington
 Aubrey Plaza
 Romesh Ranganathan
 Dan Renton Skinner
 Leonard Rossiter
 Adam Scott
 Peter Sellers
 Sarah Silverman
 Mel Smith
 Ned Sparks
 Martin Starr
 Simon Pegg
 Joe Pera
 Jack Soo
 Ben Stein
 Jon Stewart
 Tim & Eric
 Jackie Vernon
 Abe Vigoda
 Christopher Walken
 Kristen Wiig
 Joe Wilkinson
 Fred Willard
 Steven Wright

See also

 List of comedians
 Lists of comedians
 List of stand-up comedians

References

Lists of comedians